Deb Mukherjee is an Indian actor. His daughter Sunita (from his first marriage) is married to director Ashutosh Gowariker, while his son (from his second marriage) is director Ayan Mukherjee.

He is part of the famous Mukherjee family whose involvement with the film industry spans four generations, beginning from the 1930s. His father was Sashadhar Mukherjee, the owner of Filmalaya studios, who produced Love in Shimla (1960). His mother, Satidevi Mukherjee, was the only sister of pioneer actor Ashok Kumar, Anup Kumar and singer Kishore Kumar. His brothers are Joy Mukherjee, a successful actor in the 1960s and Shomu Mukherjee, the husband of actress Tanuja. His nieces are actresses Kajol and Tanisha. Other members of his family include Rani Mukerji and Sharbani Mukherjee.

Filmography

References

External links

Indian male film actors
Bengali male actors
Living people
Male actors in Hindi cinema
Male actors in Bengali cinema
20th-century Indian male actors
21st-century Indian male actors
Year of birth missing (living people)